The Great Flamarion is a 1945 film noir mystery film directed by Anthony Mann starring Erich von Stroheim and Mary Beth Hughes. The film, like many films noir, is shot in flashback narrative. The film was produced by Republic Pictures.

This film is now in the public domain.

Plot

The film opens following a murder at a cabaret in Mexico City in 1936; a shot is heard, but the body of the female victim (Connie) has been strangled. The police take the woman's husband into custody, assuming he is the murderer. But Flamarion, who has been shot, is the murderer and he explains to a stagehand why he killed Connie in flashback.The Great Flamarion (Erich von Stroheim) is an arrogant, friendless, and misogynous marksman who displays his trick gunshot act in the vaudeville circuit. His show features a beautiful assistant, Connie (Mary Beth Hughes) and her drunken husband Al (Dan Duryea), Flamarion's other assistant. Flamarion falls in love with Connie, the movie's femme fatale, and is soon manipulated by her into killing her no good husband during one of their acts.

After Al's supposed accidental death, Connie convinces Flamarion to wait three months before the two can marry and flees back to Minnesota. Meanwhile, Connie has already begun a relationship with another performer, Eddie (Stephen Barclay). After failing to show up at an arranged meeting place three months later, Flamarion goes into a downward spiral of drinking and gambling. Flamarion eventually finds Connie who informs him that she never loved him and used him to get rid of her husband.

Cast
 Erich von Stroheim as The Great Flamarion
 Mary Beth Hughes as Connie Wallace
 Dan Duryea as Al Wallace
 Stephen Barclay as Eddie Wheeler
 Lester Allen as Tony
 Esther Howard as Cleo
 Michael Mark as Nightwatchman

See also
 Public domain film
 List of American films of 1945
 List of films in the public domain in the United States

References

External links

 
 
 
 
 
  (public domain)

1945 films
American black-and-white films
1940s English-language films
Film noir
Films directed by Anthony Mann
Republic Pictures films
Films set in Chicago
Films set in Mexico City
Films set in Los Angeles
Films set in the 1930s
American mystery drama films
1940s mystery drama films
1945 drama films
1940s American films